Hermon H. Conwell (1886–1980) was an American engineer and college football player and coach. He served as the head football coach at the University of New Mexico in 1908, compiling a record of 5–1.

Conwell was a 1907 graduate of Kansas State University, where he majored in electrical engineering. He served as a faculty member at the University of Kansas, the University of Idaho and Beloit College.

References

External links
 

1886 births
1980 deaths
Kansas State Wildcats football players
New Mexico Lobos football coaches
Beloit College faculty
University of Idaho faculty
University of Kansas faculty